"How Will I Know (Who You Are)" is a song recorded by Swedish singer Jessica Folcker. It is produced by Kristian Lundin and was released in 1998 as the second single from Folcker's first studio album, Jessica (1998). Lyrically it describes the hard feelings of letting go of a relationship and saying goodbye. It was an international hit and went platinum in Sweden, after reaching number seven on Sverigetopplistan. Additionally, it was a top 10 hit also in Austria and the Netherlands, and a top 20 hit in Belgium, Denmark, Norway and Switzerland. On the Eurochart Hot 100, the track peaked at number 33 in April 1999. Backing vocals are performed by Andreas Carlsson, who co-wrote it with Lundin and Max Martin. A music video was produced to promote the single.

Track listing

Charts

Weekly charts

Year-end charts

References

1998 singles
1998 songs
Jive Records singles
Songs written by Kristian Lundin
Songs written by Max Martin
English-language Swedish songs
Songs written by Andreas Carlsson